International Chess Magazine (ICM) was a chess magazine established in 1885 by World Chess Champion Wilhelm Steinitz. The magazine was published until 1891. The magazine was based in United States.

References

External links
 Early Uses of ‘World Chess Champion’
 The Origin of International Chess Events
 The Collected Works of Wilhelm Steinitz
 Chess Periodicals
 The International Chess Magazine at Hathitrust 

1885 in chess
1891 in chess
Chess periodicals
Magazines established in 1885
Magazines disestablished in 1891
Defunct magazines published in the United States